Kuarsi is a village and municipality located in Himachal Pradesh, India.

Other surrounding towns in the area include:
Banun, Dharamshala, and Chhatrari. Kuarsi is administrated by a Sarpanch, who is the elected representative of the village.

References 

Villages in Chamba district